Kim Tong-jeong (died 1273) was a general in Goryeo dynasty.

During Sambyeolcho Rebellion 
After Bae Jung-son was killed in Jindo Island by Goryeo-Mongolian allies at 1271, Kim Tong-jeong and a few Sambyeolcho Army escaped Jindo Island and moved to Tamna Island (now Jeju Island). After, he still was opposed to Mongolian Yuan dynasty. In 1273, Korean Goryeo government defeated the rebellion with the aid of Mongolian force and then he committed suicide, although some tales of him in Jeju tell he is killed by Kim Bang-kyung de Goryeo and later burning his wife to death.

There are two views about Kim Tong-jeong. In the Goryeo dynasty, he is perceived as a bad general as he is described at Goryeosa (History of Goryeo) due to stealing and bothering Tamna. On the contrast, the subjects of Tamna recorded that he was treated like hero.

See also 

 Sambyeolcho Rebellion
 Bae Jung-son
 Sambyeolcho
 Goryeo
 Mongol invasions of Korea

References 

13th-century Korean people
Korean generals
1273 deaths
Year of birth unknown